North Lake is an unincorporated community and census-designated place located in the town of Merton, in Waukesha County, Wisconsin, United States. It was first named a CDP at the 2020 census, which showed a population of 247.
North Lake is located on Wisconsin Highway 83 north of Chenequa. North Lake has a post office with ZIP code 53064.

History
James Barney Marsh (1856-1936), engineer and bridge builder, was born in North Lake.

Demographics

References

Unincorporated communities in Waukesha County, Wisconsin
Unincorporated communities in Wisconsin
Census-designated places in Waukesha County, Wisconsin
Census-designated places in Wisconsin